The 2008–09 Montenegrin First Handball League was third season of the Montenegrin First League of Men's Handball, Montenegro's premier handball league.

Participants 

In the Montenegrin First League 2008/09 participated eight teams. For the first time, league didn't have two parts of competition. So, the clubs played 28 legs in the unique league.

The following eight clubs participated in the Montenegrin First League 2007/08.

Final table 

During the season, all members played 28 games. At the end, Budućnost won their first national trophy, with five points more than Lovćen.

Final table:

Budućnost and Lovćen rivalry 

Season will be remembered by the big rivalry between Lovćen Cetinje and Budućnost Podgorica. Their match in Podgorica, which decided about national champion, played in 26th Leg on May 17, 2009, was the most attended game in the history of Montenegrin First League (4,000 spectators). Budućnost won 28:26 (18:14) and hold the first title in the club history. Match ended with incidents in Sports center 'Morača', with the clash of supporters, but the players Goran Đukanović (Budućnost) and Igor Marković (Lovćen) too.

Four days later, Lovćen and Budućnost played another important match - final of the Cup of Montenegro. In front of 2,000 spectators in Cetinje, Lovćen won 26:25 (13:12).

During the season, match Berane - Lovćen, played in March, was dissolved too, after big incidents and fights on the ground.

Summary 

 Promotion to the EHF Champions League - qualifiers 2009/10: Budućnost Podgorica
 Promotion to the EHF Cup Winners' Cup 2009/10: Lovćen Cetinje
 Promotion to the EHF Cup 2009/10: Sutjeska Nikšić
 Promotion to the EHF Challenge Cup 2009/10: Berane, Budvanska rivijera Budva
 Relegation to the Second League 2009/10: Mojkovac (due to finances)
 Promotion to the First league 2009/10: Danilovgrad

Handball leagues in Montenegro
Hand
Hand
Monte